Delaware  (also known as Delaware Station) is an unincorporated community and census-designated place (CDP) located along the Delaware River within Knowlton Township in Warren County, New Jersey. It was created as part of the 2010 United States Census. As of the 2010 Census, the CDP's population was 150. The area is served as United States Postal Service ZIP code 07833.

History
Railroad magnate John I. Blair purchased land in the area and had it surveyed into lots in 1856. The Delaware, Lackawanna and Western Railroad began passenger service in July 1856. A storehouse built by Blair in 1860 was also used as the post office.

Geography
According to the United States Census Bureau, the CDP had a total area of 0.410 square miles (1.063 km2), including 0.380 square miles (0.985 km2) of land and 0.030 square miles (0.078 km2) of water (7.38%).

Demographics

Census 2000
As of the 2000 United States Census, the population for ZIP Code Tabulation Area 07833 was 159.

Census 2010

Historic district

The Delaware Historic District is a  historic district encompassing the community. It was added to the National Register of Historic Places on March 20, 2003 for its significance in architecture, community development, commerce, transportation, recreation and industry. The district includes 60 contributing buildings, 3 contributing structures, and 3 contributing sites. The Federal-style Dr. Jabez Gwinnup House is one of the oldest houses in the district, built .

Notable people

People who were born in, residents of, or otherwise closely associated with Delaware include:
 Charles H. Flummerfelt (1863-1931), politician who served in the Washington House of Representatives and Washington State Senate.

See also
 National Register of Historic Places listings in Warren County, New Jersey
 Darlington's Bridge at Delaware Station

References

External links

Census-designated places in Warren County, New Jersey
Knowlton Township, New Jersey